In cell biology, a precursor cell, also called a blast cell or simply blast, is a partially differentiated cell, usually referred to as a unipotent cell that has lost most of its stem cell properties. A precursor cell is also known as a progenitor cell but progenitor cells are multipotent. Precursor cells are known as the intermediate cell before they become differentiated after being a stem cell.

Usually, a precursor cell is a stem cell with the capacity to differentiate into only one cell type. Sometimes, precursor cell is used as an alternative term for unipotent stem cells. In embryology, precursor cells are a group of cells that later differentiate into one organ.

A blastoma is any cancer created by malignancies of precursor cells.

Precursor cells, and progenitor cells, have many potential uses in medicine. , there is research being done to use these cells to build heart valves, blood vessels and other tissues, by using blood and muscle precursor, or progenitor cells.

Cytological types
Oligodendrocyte precursor cell
Myeloblast
Thymocyte
Meiocyte
Megakaryoblast
Promegakaryocyte
Melanoblast
Lymphoblast
Bone marrow precursor cells
Normoblast
Angioblast (endothelial precursor cells)
Myeloid precursor cells
Plasmablast

References

Citations

Sources 

 Precursor cell – Britannica Online Encyclopedia

External links
 NIF Search - Precursor Cell via the Neuroscience Information Framework

Cell biology
Stem cells